Chop Shop is a Canadian docusoap television series created, directed and produced by Ziad Touma that premiered on February 4, 2009, on the Slice Network. The show follows the stylists at a rock and roll hair salon in Vancouver, British Columbia. The series was produced by Paperny Films.

Episodes

External links

Production website
Slice webpage
Chop Shop Salon webpage

2009 Canadian television series debuts
2009 Canadian television series endings
2000s Canadian reality television series
Slice (TV channel) original programming
Television series by Entertainment One